Erik of het klein insectenboek (English translation: Erik or the small book of insects) is a 2004 Dutch family film, based on the homonymous book of Godfried Bomans: Erik of het klein insectenboek. It was co-produced with among others the Danish company Zeitgeist.

The film received a Golden Film for 100,000 visitors.

Cast 
 Jasper Oldenhof as Erik
 Anne-Mieke Ruyten as Erik's mother
 Yale Sackman as Rosalie
 Stany Crets as grasshopper 
 Peter Van Den Begin as centipede
 Jaak Van Assche as Erik's grandfather
 Jörgen Raymann as bumblebee
 Marius Gottlieb as Papilio
 Lenette van Dongen as teacher
 Alfred van den Heuvel as Mister Vliesvleugel

External links

2004 films
Dutch children's films
2000s Dutch-language films
Dutch fantasy films
Films based on Dutch novels
Films about insects